David M. Maloney Sr. (born August 25, 1960) is an American politician from the Commonwealth of Pennsylvania. A member of the Republican Party, he is a member of the Pennsylvania House of Representatives from the 130th District.

Early life
Maloney was born on August 25, 1960 in Lansdale, Pennsylvania. He graduated from Boyertown High School in 1987.

Career
A carpenter by trade, Maloney served on the Oley Valley School Board from 2006 to 2009.

In 2010, was elected to represent the 130th District in the Pennsylvania House of Representatives. He was re-elected to six more consecutive terms.

In 2020, Maloney was among 26 Pennsylvania House Republicans who called for the reversal of Joe Biden's certification as the winner of Pennsylvania's electoral votes in the 2020 United States presidential election, citing false claims of election irregularities.

In 2023, Maloney was assigned Republican chairman of the House Game and Fisheries Committee for the 2023-24 Legislative Session.

Personal life
Maloney and his wife Deborah D., live in Pike Township, Berks County, Pennsylvania. They have four children and seven grandchildren.

References

External links

State Representative David Maloney official caucus site
David Maloney (R) official PA House site

Living people
Republican Party members of the Pennsylvania House of Representatives
21st-century American politicians
1960 births